The 2004–05 Utah Utes men's basketball team represented the University of Utah in the 2004–05 season. Led by first year head coach Ray Giacoletti, due to longtime head coach Rick Majerus' resignation one year prior, the Utes made the Sweet Sixteen in the NCAA tournament. After the season, Sophomore forward Andrew Bogut was selected first overall in the NBA draft, by the Milwaukee Bucks, eventually playing with the Golden State Warriors (with whom he would win the NBA championship in 2015), the Dallas Mavericks, the Cleveland Cavaliers, and the Los Angeles Lakers. Bogut (who was born in Australia) also became the first foreign-born player to be drafted first overall from an American college.

Roster

Tournament results

Mountain West tournament
3/10/05 @ Pepsi Center, Denver, CO Vs. Colorado State (Quarterfinals) W, 62–49
3/11/05 @ Pepsi Center, Denver, CO Vs. UNLV (Semifinals) W, 73–67
3/12/05 @ Pepsi Center, Denver, CO Vs. New Mexico (Final) L, 56–60

NCAA tournament
3/17/05 @ McKale Center, Tucson, AZ Vs. UTEP (round of 64) W, 60–54
3/19/05 @ McKale Center, Tucson, AZ Vs. Oklahoma (round of 32) W, 67–58
3/25/05 @ Frank Erwin Center, Austin, TX Vs. Kentucky (Sweet Sixteen) L, 52–62

Rankings

Awards and honors
Andrew Bogut – National Player of the Year, Consensus First-team All-American, Pete Newell Big Man Award, MWC Player of the Year

Team players in the 2005 NBA draft

References

Utah Utes men's basketball seasons
Utah
Utah
Utah Utes
Utah Utes